Kenneth Lawrence Solheim (born March 27, 1961) is a Canadian former professional ice hockey forward who played 135 games in the National Hockey League for the Chicago Black Hawks, Detroit Red Wings, Minnesota North Stars and Edmonton Oilers between 1980 and 1986.

Solheim was born in Hythe, Alberta and raised in Grande Prairie, Alberta.

Career statistics

Regular season and playoffs

Awards
 WHL Second All-Star Team – 1980
 WHL First All-Star Team – 1981

External links
 

1961 births
Living people
Adirondack Red Wings players
Birmingham South Stars players
Canadian ice hockey forwards
Chicago Blackhawks draft picks
Chicago Blackhawks players
Detroit Red Wings players
Edmonton Oilers players
Ice hockey people from Alberta
Medicine Hat Tigers players
Minnesota North Stars players
Nashville South Stars players
Nova Scotia Oilers players
People from Grande Prairie
People from the County of Grande Prairie No. 1
Springfield Indians players
St. Albert Saints players